The 1959 Wimbledon Championships took place on the outdoor grass courts at the All England Lawn Tennis and Croquet Club in Wimbledon, London, United Kingdom. The tournament was held from Monday 22 June until Saturday 4 July 1959. It was the 73rd staging of the Wimbledon Championships, and the third Grand Slam tennis event of 1959.

Champions

Seniors

Men's singles

 Alex Olmedo defeated  Rod Laver, 6–4, 6–3, 6–4

Women's singles

 Maria Bueno defeated  Darlene Hard, 6–4, 6–3

Men's doubles

 Roy Emerson /  Neale Fraser defeated  Rod Laver /  Bob Mark, 8–6, 6–3, 14–16, 9–7

Women's doubles

 Jeanne Arth /  Darlene Hard defeated  Beverly Fleitz /  Christine Truman, 2–6, 6–2, 6–3

Mixed doubles

 Rod Laver /  Darlene Hard defeated  Neale Fraser /  Maria Bueno, 6–4, 6–3

Juniors

Boys' singles

 Toomas Leius defeated  Ronnie Barnes, 6–2, 6–4

Girls' singles

 Joan Cross defeated  Doris Schuster, 6–1, 6–1

References

External links
 Official Wimbledon Championships website

 
Wimbledon Championships
Wimbledon Championships
Wimbledon Championships
Wimbledon Championships